This is a list of persons reported to have become father of a child at or after 75 years of age. These claims have not necessarily been verified.

Medical considerations
According to a 1969 study, there is a decrease in sperm concentration as men age. The study reported that 90% of seminiferous tubules in men in their 20s and 30s contained spermatids, whereas men in their 40s and 50s had spermatids in 50% of their seminiferous tubules. In the study, only 10% of seminiferous tubules from men aged > 80 years contained spermatids. In a random international sample of 11,548 men confirmed to be biological fathers by DNA paternity testing, the oldest father was found to be 66 years old at the birth of his child; the ratio of DNA-confirmed versus DNA-rejected paternity tests around that age is in agreement with the notion of general male infertility above age 65-66.

List of claims

See also
List of oldest birth mothers
List of people with the most children
List of multiple births
List of youngest birth fathers
List of youngest birth mothers
Pregnancy
Abraham and his son Isaac
Genealogies of Genesis including multiple accounts of super-aged fathers

References

External links
Well Known Fathers After 50
Who's broody now?
Older men who want to go from here to paternity

Fathers
Gerontology
Sexuality and age
Lists of men
Fatherhood
Human pregnancy
Biological records
Oldest things
Parenting-related lists